Robert Edmund Sherwood (1864–1946) was an American circus clown and author. Sherwood worked in circuses during the golden period of the late 19th and early 20th centuries and wrote two popular circus memoirs: Here We are Again: Recollections of an Old Circus Clown (1926) and Hold Yer Hosses! The Elephants are Coming! (1932).

Bibliography
The Slang Slycopaedia of Baseball: An Exhaustive Work on Spiels and Wheezes .. (1914)
Charles Chaplin's Funny Sayings (1915; co-authored with Charlie Chaplin)
Here We are Again: Recollections of an Old Circus Clown (1926)
The L-A-U-G-H book (1927)
Rambles, a real test of memory : questions every person should be able to answer correctly (co-authored with Karl K. Kitchen and Calder Johnson)
Hold Everything! (1929)
Hold Yer Hosses! The Elephants are Coming! (1932)

References

American clowns
1864 births
1946 deaths
American memoirists